The English Partnership for Snooker and Billiards (EPSB), established in the Summer of 2015, describes itself as "an umbrella organisation that aligns the interests of the affiliated bodies and creates projects to inspire and drive awareness of snooker and billiards."

It has been responsible for the governance of amateur snooker in England since June 2019, when a resolution was passed by the English Association of Snooker and Billiards (EASB) to transfer its assets and operations to the EPSB. It organises tournaments including the English Amateur Championship.

The EPSB has four affiliated bodies:
 World Professional Billiards and Snooker Association
 World Billiards
 World Disability Billiards and Snooker
 World Women's Snooker

The English Association of Snooker and Billiards was previously an affiliated organisation.

References

External links 
 EPSB Official Website
 World Professional Billiards & Snooker Association (WPBSA) Official website
 World Billiards Official website
 World Disability Billiards & Snooker Official website
 World Women's Snooker Official website

Snooker governing bodies
Snooker in the United Kingdom
Organisations based in Bristol